The  was a Japanese domain of the Edo period, with its headquarters within the city limits of present-day Yamato-Kōriyama, Nara. It was ruled for the entirety of its history by the branch of the Katagiri family founded by Katagiri Sadataka, a younger brother of the famed Katagiri Katsumoto. In July 1871, with the abolition of the han system the Koizumi Domain became Koizumi Prefecture, and later it was finally made a part of Nara Prefecture.

List of lords

Katagiri clan (Tozama daimyō; 10,000→16,000→13,000→11,000 koku)

The second lord, Katagiri Sadamasa (1605-73), is an important figure in the history of the Japanese tea ceremony. He founded the Sekishū-ryū school of Japanese tea ceremony, and in Japanese tea history, is usually known as Katagiri Sekishū.

References
 Koizumi on "Edo 300 HTML" (30 Sept. 2007)
Papinot, E., Historical and Geographical Dictionary of Japan (Rutland and Tokyo: Charles E. Tuttle Co.,1973, 2nd printing).
Genshoku Chadō Daijiten Japanese encyclopedia of the Way of Tea. Tokyo: Tankosha, 1992, 15th ed. 

Yahoo Japan internet encyclopedia (in Japanese), entry for Koizumi-han, at http://100.yahoo.co.jp/detail/%E5%B0%8F%E6%B3%89%E8%97%A9/

Domains of Japan